Kevin Wynn Adams Jr.  is an American college basketball player for the Kansas Jayhawks of the Big 12 Conference.

Early life and high school
Adams grew up in Austin, Texas and attended Westlake High School, where he played basketball and lacrosse. He averaged 22.6 points, 6.7 rebounds, and 3.5 assists per game during his junior season. Adams was named 6A All-State as a senior after averaging 25.0 points, 7.5 rebounds, and 4.1 assists per game.

Adams was rated a four-star recruit according to major recruiting services. He committed to play college basketball at Kansas over offers Baylor, Georgetown, Arkansas, Texas, Iowa, Texas Tech, and Oklahoma.

College career
Adams played in 37 of Kansas's 40 games during his freshman season and averaged  4.8 minutes played, 1.0 point, and 0.8 rebounds per game. He played three total minutes in the Kansas' 72-69 victory in 2022 national championship game against North Carolina and was a defensive substitution for the final possession of the game. Adams entered his sophomore season as the Jayhawks' starting small forward. As a sophomore, he was named Big 12 Most Improved Player.

References

External links
Kansas Jayhawks bio

Living people
American men's basketball players
Basketball players from Austin, Texas
Small forwards
Kansas Jayhawks men's basketball players